Jørgen Arboe-Rasmussen (5 March 1925 – 5 or 6 February 1945) was a member of the Danish resistance killed by the German occupying power.

Biography 

Arboe-Rasmussen was born 5 March 1925 to chief editor of Ekstrabladet Erik Arboe-Rasmussen and wife Alma Louise Amanda née Hansen Fossing and baptized in Christian's church on the third Sunday after Easter the same year.

On 5 February 1945 Arboe-Rasmussen was gunned down in Café Brønnum near Kongens Nytorv in August Bournonvilles Passage 1 (at that time named Tordenskjoldsgade).

He was brought to the German medical clinic at Nyelandsvej where he died of his wounds the same or the following day.

After his death 

After the liberation Arboe-Rasmussen's remains were exhumed at Ryvangen and transferred to the Department of Forensic Medicine of the university of Copenhagen.

On 27 June 1945 a memorial service was held for him in the Church of Holmen.

On 29 August 1945 Arboe-Rasmussen and 105 other victims of the occupation were given a state funeral in the memorial park founded at the execution and burial site in Ryvangen where his remains had been recovered. Bishop Hans Fuglsang-Damgaard led the service with participation from the royal family, the government and representatives of the resistance movement.

A memorial plaque at August Bournonvilles Passage 1 commemorates his sacrifice for Denmark.

Every year on 5 February the Danish Union of Journalists awards the memorial grant Jørgen Arboe Rasmussens Mindelegat to a journalist trainee at a provincial newspaper.

References 

1925 births
1945 deaths
Danish resistance members
Resistance members killed by Nazi Germany
Danish civilians killed in World War II
People executed by Nazi Germany by firearm
Deaths by firearm in Denmark